James Kenyon (23 July 1875 – 23 July 1935) was a Canadian sports shooter. He competed in the men's trap event at the 1912 Summer Olympics.

References

1875 births
1935 deaths
Canadian male sport shooters
Olympic shooters of Canada
Shooters at the 1912 Summer Olympics
Sportspeople from Oldham